Hellinsia probatus is a moth of the family Pterophoridae. It is known from New Guinea.

References

External links
Papua Insects

probatus
Moths of New Guinea
Moths described in 1938